Heinrich Arthur Matthes (11 January 1902 – 16 December 1978) was a German SS commander during the Nazi era. He served as a deputy commandant of Treblinka extermination camp during the Operation Reinhard phase of the Holocaust in Poland. Matthes was appointed chief of the extermination area at Camp 2 where the gas chambers were built and managed by the SS personnel overseeing some 300 slave labourers disposing of corpses under penalty of death. He was tried in the 1964 Treblinka trials, convicted, and sentenced to life imprisonment.

Life
Matthes was born in 1902 in Wermsdorf, near Leipzig.  His father was a senior male nurse.  Matthes attended public elementary school for eight years.  He then became a tailor, but changed careers to nurse.  He trained at Sonnenstein and took his exam there.  Then he worked at the Arnsdorf and Bräunsdorf hospitals.  He married and had one daughter. At the beginning of 1934, he joined both the Nazi Party and the SA.  When World War II broke out, he was drafted into the army. After about two years, Matthes was then recruited by Action T4, the Nazi state-sponsored program to kill disabled persons.  He worked in the T4 photo laboratory and then served in the T4 unit with Organization Todt in Russia. Matthes last rank in the Heer was Obergefreiter.

Treblinka death camp

In August 1942, Matthes was ordered to Lublin reservation, where he was in short time drafted into the SS with the rank of Scharführer (Sergeant), dispatched to Operation Reinhard, and sent to Treblinka extermination camp.  There he was appointed chief officer commanding Camp II (the extermination area) and the gas chambers. Matthes was remembered by fellow Treblinka SS officer Franz Suchomel in the following way:

Matthes was obsessed with cleanliness.  In the autumn of 1942, Matthes shot two prisoners because at the end of the work day they had not properly cleaned to his satisfaction the stretcher which they used to transport corpses. In the winter of 1942–43, a typhus epidemic broke out in Treblinka.  Matthes took eight sick inmates to the Lazarett and had them shot.  During that same winter he shot the prisoner Ilik Weintraub because, while transferring bodies from the gas chambers to the pits, Weintraub had stopped for a moment to drink some water from the well.

Matthes as remembered by Jerzy Rajgrodzki, a prisoner in the extermination area:

In the autumn of 1943 Matthes was transferred to Sobibor extermination camp. He later served in Trieste with the other Operation Reinhard perpetrators. At the Treblinka Trials in 1965 he was sentenced to life imprisonment. Mathes died in prison in 1978.

Matthes testimonies at trial

 

Matthes Rank Summary

     SA-Sturmmann

     Obergefreiter C. 1942 

  SS-Scharführer August 1942

  SS-Oberscharführer 

     Oberwachtmeister der Polizei Early 1944

References

1902 births
Year of death unknown
People from Wermsdorf
German nurses
People convicted in the Treblinka trials
Sturmabteilung personnel
SS non-commissioned officers
Treblinka extermination camp personnel
People from the Kingdom of Saxony
German people convicted of murder
German prisoners sentenced to life imprisonment
People convicted of murder by Guernsey
Prisoners sentenced to life imprisonment by Germany
Prisoners who died in German detention
Nazis who died in prison custody
German prisoners of war in World War II held by the United States